Hellenic Seaplanes (Greek Ελληνικά Υδροπλάνα Α.Ε.) is a seaplane company in Greece with its own maintenance, training, flight operations and water aerodrome development strategy. The main base is in Athens and soon will operate connecting all Greek Islands to the mainland. 

According to Hellenic Seaplane's statement, the company aims to fly from port to port among the islands, coastal cities of central Greece and lakes throughout the country, in order to cover the deficiencies of the current transportation system with new alternative mode of transport that will give a solution to the lengthy and difficult transportation that currently exists, while giving a new boost for tourism activities.

As of 2021 the company had yet to commence operations.

History 
Hellenic Seaplanes S.A. was established in May 2013 in Athens, by Mister Nicolas Charalambous, following the passing of bill 4146/2013 that set out the framework for water aerodrome and seaplane operations in Greece.

Services 
The company will generate revenues from the provision of the following products and services:

 Scheduled Flights
 Sightseeing /Cruise Ships
 Charter and For Hire Flights
 Resort Transfers
 Freight and Courier Services
 Medevac Services

Seaplane Operations 
The Seaplane operations have been placed around ten (10) geographic regions which are as follows:

 Region 1 Central Greece - Attica
 Region 2 Crete
 Region 3 Thrace – North Aegean islands
 Region 4 Macedonia
 Region 5 Epirus
 Region 6 Dodecanese islands
 Region 7 Peloponnese
 Region 8 Ionian islands - Western Greece
 Region 9 Cyclades islands
 Region 10 Thessaly

References 

Airlines of Greece
Airlines established in 2013
Seaplane operators
Greek companies established in 2013
Greek brands
Companies based in Athens